Valentin-Yves Mudimbe (born 8 December 1941, Jadotville, Belgian Congo) is a Congolese philosopher, professor, and author of poems, novels, as well as books and articles on African culture and intellectual history. Mudimbe is Ruth F. DeVarney Professor of Romance Studies and professor of comparative literature at Duke University and maître de conferences at the École des hautes études en sciences sociales in Paris.

Early life and career
He was born in the Belgian Congo, now the Democratic Republic of the Congo. As a young man, he joined a monastery, but left in 1962 in order to study the forces that shaped African history. He studied in Louvain (PhD, 1970), came back to Congo and flew to the United States in 1979 for political reasons. He has taught at Haverford College and Stanford University, and is now Professor Emeritus in the Program in Literature at Duke University. His work has had a major impact on many disciplines including African studies, Philosophy, Sociology, Anthropology, Linguistics, Literature, and History.

Work
Mudimbe's work is considered as highly influential for African studies, notably for his major book The Invention of Africa (1988). His writings transformed the intellectual history of Africa by challenging the dominant historic reconstruction of Greek philosophy which according to him was racialised. The influence of Mudimbe's writings for African studies was compared to that of Edward Said's book Orientalism for postcolonial studies. Mudimbe showed that without critiquing the epistemologies which were the basis of the discourses about Africa critical approaches can become fruitless. He received the Herskovits Award given by African Studies Association in 1989.

Mudimbe focuses most closely on phenomenology, structuralism, mythical narratives, and the practice and use of language. As a professor, he has taught courses on these topics, as well as on ancient Greek cultural geography.

Education
Junior College Degree, Lovanium University, Leopoldville (Kinshasa), Congo (1962)
Diploma, Lovanium University, Kinshasa, Congo (1964)
BA, Lovanium University, Kinshasa (1966)
Graduate Studies, University of Paris (1968)
PhD with High Honors, Catholic University of Leuven, Belgium (1970)

Books
Novels
Déchirures (1971)
Entre les eaux (1973); trans. as Between Tides by Stephen Baker (1991)
Entretailles (1973)
L'Autre Face du royaume (1973)
Les Fuseaux (1974)
Le Bel immonde (1976); trans. as Before the Birth of the Moon by Marjolijn de Jager (1989)
L'Ecart (1979); trans. as The Rift by Marjolijn de Jager (1993)
Shaba deux (1988)
Les Corps glorieux des mots et des êtres (1994)

Essays
The Mudimbe Reader, Edited by Pierre-Philippe Fraiture and Daniel Orrells, University of Virginia Press. 
L'Odeur du père, Présence Africaine (1982)
The Invention of Africa : Gnosis, Philosophy and the Order of Knowledge, Indiana University Press (1988)
Parables and Fables : Exegesis Textuality and Politics in Central Africa, The University of Wisconsin Press (1991)
The Surreptitious Speech: Presence Africaine and the Politics of Otherness 1947-1987, University of Chicago Press (1992)
Africa & the Disciplines, coeditor, University of Chicago Press (1993)
The Idea of Africa, African Systems of Thought, Indiana University Press, (1994)
Tales of Faith: Religion as Political Performance in Central Africa, Athlone Press (1997)
Nations, Identities, Cultures, editor, Duke University Press (1997)
Diaspora and Immigration, coeditor, South Atlantic Quarterly special issue, Duke University Press (1999)
The Normal & Its Orders, coeditor, Editions Malaïka (2007)
On African Fault Lines: Meditations on Alterity Politics, University of KwaZulu-Natal Press (2013)

Secondary literature
In English
White fathers in colonial central Africa : a critical examination of V.Y. Mudimbe's theories on missionary discourse in Africa Friedrich Stenger, Münster : London : Lit, 2002.
"Wylie on Mudimbe, 'The Idea of Africa'", Kenneth C. Wylie, H-Africa (1996).
Singular performances : reinscribing the subject in Francophone African writing, Charlottesville : University of Virginia Press, 2002.
"An Archaeology of African Knowledge: A Discussion of V. Y. Mudimbe", D. A. Masolo. 
Postcolonial theory and Francophone literary studies, Adlai Murdoch and Anne Donadey. Gainesville : University Press of Florida, 2005.
Postcolonial Francophone autobiographies : from Africa to the Antilles Edgard Sankara, Charlottesville : University of Virginia Press, 2011.
VY Mudimbe: Undisciplined Africanism Pierre-Philippe Fraiture, Liverpool, Liverpool University Press, 2013.
Neil Lazarus (2005) Representation and terror in V.Y. Mudimbe, Journal of African Cultural Studies, 17:1, 81-101

In French
V.Y. Mudimbe, ou, Le discours, l'écart et l'écriture, Bernard Mouralis, Présence Africaine, Paris, 1988
Le roman africain face aux discours hégémoniques : étude sur l'énonciation et l'idéologie dans l'œuvre de V.Y. Mudimbe, Jean-Christophe Luhaka A. Kasende, L'harmattan 2001.
L'Afrique au miroir des littératures, des sciences de l'homme et de la société : mélanges offerts à V.Y. Mudimbe, Kasende, Jean-Christophe Luhaka A, L'harmattan, 2003.
V.Y. Mudimbe et la ré-invention de l'Afrique: poétique et politique de la décolonisation des sciences humaines, Kasereka Kavwhairehi, éditions Rodopi, 2006.
Pour un nouvel ordre africain de la connaissance : hommage à V.Y. Mudimbe sous la direction de Alphonse Mbuyamba-Kankolongo, Paris, 2011.

See also 
African philosophy
List of American philosophers
Postcolonialism

References

External links 
Mudimbe's faculty page at Duke University
University of Cambridge – lecture announcement which explains some of Mudimbe's beliefs (especially about the social sciences) and gives some biographical information
Electronic Review of French and Italian Literary Essays – review of Mudimbe's The Invention of Africa by a Northwestern University professor; touches on his philosophies

Duke University faculty
20th-century American philosophers
21st-century American philosophers
1941 births
Living people
People from Likasi
Democratic Republic of the Congo non-fiction writers
Democratic Republic of the Congo Africanists
Democratic Republic of the Congo philosophers
Democratic Republic of the Congo poets
Democratic Republic of the Congo novelists
Lovanium University alumni
Catholic University of Leuven (1834–1968) alumni
French philosophers